Island Beach may refer to:

Island Beach (barrier island), a barrier peninsula in Ocean County, New Jersey, U.S.
Island Beach, New Jersey, a former municipality on the peninsula
Island Beach State Park, a park occupying the land of the former municipality
Island Beach, South Australia, a locality on Kangaroo Island